Tanguy Coulibaly (born 18 February 2001) is a French professional footballer who plays as a winger for Bundesliga club VfB Stuttgart.

Club career

Paris Saint-Germain 
Coulibaly is a product of the Paris Saint-Germain Youth Academy. During the 2018–19 season, he played for the U19 side of the club, grabbing one goal and two assists in seven UEFA Youth League appearances. He left Paris Saint-Germain in 2019, having not played any senior football in France.

VfB Stuttgart 
On 2 July 2019, Coulibaly signed for VfB Stuttgart on a four-year contract. He made his debut in the 2. Bundesliga for the team on 20 October 2019 against Holstein Kiel.

Coulibaly's first goal for VfB Stuttgart came in a 3–1 home loss to Bayern Munich on 28 November 2020. On 12 December, he scored in a 5–1 away win against Borussia Dortmund at the Westfalenstadion.

International career 
In 2019, Coulibaly was called up by the Mali U20 national team for the FIFA U-20 World Cup in Poland.

Career statistics

References

External links
 
 

2001 births
Living people
People from Sèvres
French footballers
Black French sportspeople
French sportspeople of Malian descent
Association football wingers
VfB Stuttgart II players
VfB Stuttgart players
French expatriate footballers
French expatriate sportspeople in Germany
Expatriate footballers in Germany
Oberliga (football) players
2. Bundesliga players
Bundesliga players